Wittenwil is a village and former municipality in the district of Frauenfeld in the canton of Thurgau, Switzerland.

In 1996 the municipality was incorporated and divided into the municipalities Aadorf and Wängi.

External links
http://www.wittenwil.ch

Former municipalities of Thurgau
Villages in Switzerland